Hedobiini is a tribe of death-watch and spider beetles in the family Ptinidae. There are at least two genera and three described species in Hedobiini.

Genera
These two genera belong to the tribe Hedobiini:
 Neohedobia Fisher, 1919 i c g b
 Ptinomorphus Mulsant & Rey, 1868 g b
Data sources: i = ITIS, c = Catalogue of Life, g = GBIF, b = Bugguide.net

References

Further reading

 
 
 
 
 
 
 
 
 
 

Bostrichoidea